Wolfgang Jünger (c. 1517 – 4 March 1564) was Thomaskantor from 1536 to 1539.

References

Thomaskantors
1510s births
1564 deaths
16th-century German composers